Normal law may refer to:

 Normal distribution and the Gaussian law(s) relating to the bell curve
 The primary flight control mode for fly-by-wire Airbus aircraft
 Ordinary law, law lower than the Constitution